Chandan Kumar Singh (born 5 June 1985) is an Indian international lawn bowler. He is a two times Asian Champion and has represented India at three Commonwealth Games.

Singh has twice won a gold medal at the Asian Lawn Bowls Championship, once in 2016 in the fours and the following year in 2017 in the triples.

In 2014 and 2018, he competed in the 2014 Commonwealth Games and the 2018 Commonwealth Games.

In 2022, he was selected for the 2022 Commonwealth Games in Birmingham, where he competed in two events; the men's triples and the men's fours. In the fours event as part of the team with Sunil Bahadur, Navneet Singh and Dinesh Kumar he reached the final and secured a silver medal.

References 

Indian bowls players
Living people
1985 births
Bowls players at the 2014 Commonwealth Games
Bowls players at the 2018 Commonwealth Games
Bowls players at the 2022 Commonwealth Games
Commonwealth Games medallists in lawn bowls
Commonwealth Games silver medallists for India
20th-century Indian people
21st-century Indian people
Medallists at the 2022 Commonwealth Games